De La Rama Steamship Company, Inc. was a shipping company founded in New York City by the Isidro de la Rama family in 1930. Isidro de la Rama family founded the De La Rama Steamship Company to export sugar from their large his sugar plantations in the Philippines. Isidro de la Rama was also commissioned by the United States Army to be a blockade runner to bring supplies, such as food and ammunition, to the United States Army and Philippine Army after the invasion of Empire of Japan into the Philippines.

History
Isidro de la Rama frist company was Hijos de la Rama founded in Talisay in the port at Iloilo City. His ships and tugboats operated out of Panay island in the 1800s. Isidro de la Rama had four sons each had part-time swork with the company. Isidro de la Rama son, Esteban de la Rama managed the firm after his father death. 
De La Rama Steamship Company very active in supporting the US with World War I, shipping needed abaca, copra and coal. Esteban was also a General in the Philippine army. Another son Hijos de la Rama worked in the firm till 1930. In 1930 the De la Rama Steamship Company was incorporated at Iloilo. De la Rama Steamship Company manager was Benito H. Lopez and Esteban as the shipping agent. Isidro de la Rama died on June 10, 1897. Before World War II the United States purchased about 80% of Philippine products exported, the main product was sugar. De La Rama Steamship Company Los Angeles representative was Antonio Maria Bayot.  Nephew of the Portuguese prime minister in New York City, Luiz Francisco Meirelles was manager of the New York City office. Esteban de la Rama won the election to the Philippine senate in 1941. After the war Sergio Osmeña Jr. became president of the De La Rama Steamship Company.  De la Rama Steamship was able to charter from the National Development Corporation (NDC) three large new ships. Two ships taken for the war effort were returned and they also purchased two war surplus Type C1-B cargo ships. Three war surplus coastal ships called "FS" ships were acquired with three -"F" cargo ships. To start passenger service four ship liners were acquired. Airlines ended the passenger service in the 1960s, but cargo shipping continued.

Sugar Train
One of the trains used at the Hijos de la Rama plant is on display Hacienda Hijos de La Rama, San Isidro, Negros, display at Star City Amusement Park, Manila.

World War II
With the start of World War II shipping to and from the Philippines became rare. De La Rama Steamship Company fleet of ships were used to help the World War II effort. During World War II De La Rama Steamship Company operated Merchant navy ships for the United States Shipping Board. During World War II De La Rama Steamship Company was active with charter shipping with the Maritime Commission and War Shipping Administration. De La Rama Steamship Company operated Liberty ships and Victory Ships for the merchant navy. The ship was run by its De La Rama Steamship Company crew and the US Navy supplied United States Navy Armed Guards to man the deck guns and radio.

Ships
Some ships:
Cabanbanan
Moleilo
Taculin
Iloilo 560-ton steam cargo
Escalante 1Z  95-ton motor cargo
Four new ships for New York to the Philippines, Hong Kong, and Shanghai routes.
Don Esteban built by Krupp at Kiel, Germanypassenger, built in 1934, 425-foot, 5,011-ton, became bareboat charter by to US Army 
Don Isidro, a passenger ship built in 1939, attacked by Japan on February 19, 1942, burn and lost under U.S. Army charter.
Dona Aurora, built at Cantieri Riuniti dell'Adriatico at Trieste, Italy in 1938. on December 25, 1942, was torpedoed by Italian Sub.

Dona Nati built in 1939 at Cantieri Riuniti dell'Adriatico
Dona Aniceta, passenger ship built in 1940 at Cantieri Riuniti dell'Adriatico, became polish 'General Bem and then Greek Maco Prosperity'', scrapped in 1972.
Madbukaru, 191 tons, use by US Army for war.
De La Rama Steamship Company chartered three Swedish-flag and three Norwegian-flag ships for trans-Pacific trade.
Wind Rush from Shepard Steamship Company an 8,600-ton cargo ship. Was SS Westbrook built in 1918 by Columbia River SB, ablaze in the Caribbean December 21, 1939, became Kavkaz in 1945, and scrapped 1977

Moleno, was the SS Waialeale and was converted to a 3,092 ton luxury passenger liner service started in 1947, built in 1928 by Bethlehem Steel Co., sold off in 1951 and broken up in Yokohama, Japan in 1956.

Dona Aurora (2), became Sarangani Bay, General Cargo Ship built in 1969
Dona Alicia (2) became Lingayen Gulf (sister of Dona Aurora (2) 153.7m x 19.7m, top speed of 17 knots and built in Japan.

World War II operated:
Liberty Ships:
 J. Frank Cooper  
 William Sproule
 Richard B. Moore
 George Rogers Clark
 Andreas Honcharenko
 Henry White

Victory Ships:
 Southwestern Victory  
 Norwich Victory
 Bartlesville Victory
 Hillsdale Victory

See also

World War II United States Merchant Navy

References 

Defunct shipping companies of the United States
American companies established in 1930